Tightrope is a children's novel by Gillian Cross, published in 1999. It was shortlisted for the Carnegie Medal.

It is about a teen girl named Ashley who does well at school and helps her sick mother through the day. However, she leads a double life. Her other name is Cindy, and Cindy likes to sneak out and graffiti her name on large, untouched walls; it's her release. Unfortunately someone discovers her secret and is leaving nasty letters and horrible things in her backyard. Will she ever be able to live normal life again? Without these fears she will die and never ever live a happy life again.

References

Novels by Gillian Cross
1999 British novels
British children's novels
1999 children's books
Oxford University Press books